Creepy is a San Francisco, California-based indie rock/pop punk band that formed in 2002.

The Triple EP and Strong Lies Kill Highs
In 2007, the group released a full-length CD entitled "The Triple EP" which was a collection of music from three previously unreleased EP length CDs.
 
The Triple EP received positive reviews by many critics of independent music because of its illustration of progress as the band evolved their unique sound over the 2003-2007 period. The Triple EP also received radio play on several college and independent music radio showcases. 

The band released their fourth EP in 2009 entitled, Strong Lies Kill Highs. It was announced in January 2009 in a blog on Creepy's Myspace that they plan to tour in March and April in support of their newly released EP.

Associated Acts
Notably, the original bass guitar player was Dave Chavez from hardcore bands Verbal Abuse and Code of Honor.  Adam Grant was also the drummer for hardcore bands Retching Red, featuring Cinder Block (formerly of Tilt), and Oppressed Logic.

Discography

 "Hungry Like The Wolf EP" (2003/Teeno, mixed by Ryan Greene)
 "The Gloom EP" (2005/Teeno, recorded/mixed/produced by Adam Krammer at Motor Studio SF)
 "The Triple EP" (2007/Teeno, recorded/mixed/produced by Scott Llamas at Popsmear)
 "Strong Lies Kill Highs (2009/Teeno, recorded/mixed/produced by Scott Llamas at Popsmear, mastered by Steve Hall at Future Disk)

References

External links
 Creepy on Myspace
Teeno Record Official site

Musical groups from San Francisco
Pop punk groups from California